The Hoboken catalogue is a catalogue of the musical compositions by Joseph Haydn compiled by Anthony van Hoboken. It is intended to cover the composer's entire oeuvre and includes over 750 entries. Its full title in the original German is Joseph Haydn, Thematisch-bibliographisches Werkverzeichnis ("Joseph Haydn, thematic-bibliographic catalogue of works"). The Haydn catalogue that now bears Hoboken's name was begun in card format in 1934; work continued until the publication of the third and final book volume in 1978.

Works by Haydn are often indicated using their Hoboken catalogue number, typically in the format "Violin Concerto No. 1 in C major, Hob. VIIa:1".

The catalogue
The catalogue is a massive work; a currently available version runs to 1936 pages. Each work is given with an identifying incipit, printed on a single musical line. There is discussion of manuscript sources, early editions, listing in previous catalogues (including the two Haydn prepared), and critical commentary.

Organization

Catalogues of composers' works typically follow either a chronological arrangement (sorting by date of composition) or a sorting by musical genre. Hoboken's catalogue is of the latter type; thus the symphonies, for example, are in category I, all string quartets are in category III, piano sonatas are in category XVI, and so on.

See also
List of compositions by Joseph Haydn
H. C. Robbins Landon

Notes

External links
List of works by Joseph Haydn
French Webpage on Hoboken Catalogue

Classical music catalogues